Testosterone propionate/testosterone phenylpropionate/testosterone isocaproate/testosterone decanoate (TP/TPP/TiC/TD), also known as a Sustanon 250 (Organon), is an injectable combination medication of four testosterone esters, all of which are androgens/anabolic steroids.

Pharmacology 
The four testosterone esters are as follows;

 30 mg testosterone propionate
 60 mg testosterone phenylpropionate
 60 mg testosterone isocaproate
 100 mg testosterone decanoate
Cumulatively, a 1 ml of the oil solution contains exactly 250 mg of above mentioned testosterone esters. This particular numerical  value is clearly depicted in the name of the product, Sustanon 250.

They are provided as an oil solution and are administered by intramuscular injection. The different testosterone esters provide for different elimination half-lives in the body. Esterification of testosterone provides for a sustained but non-linear release of testosterone hormone from the injection depot into the circulation. Sustanon 100 is administered once every 2 weeks and Sustanon 250 is administered once every 3 to 4 weeks.

Sustanon is the preferred method of testosterone replacement in the United Kingdom as detailed in the British National Formulary.  There was a brief shortage of Sustanon 250 during late 2011, due to shifting of manufacturing site, and a further shortage in mid-2012 due to manufacturing problems.

This form of testosterone is a popular choice of anabolic steroid among bodybuilders and athletes.

Synonyms/brands 

 Durateston
 Durandrone Forte
 Sustanon prolongatum
 Prarbolan

Medical dosage

See also
 Testosterone propionate/testosterone phenylpropionate/testosterone isocaproate
 Testosterone propionate/testosterone phenylpropionate/testosterone isocaproate/testosterone caproate
 List of combined sex-hormonal preparations § Androgens

References

Androgens and anabolic steroids
Androstanes
Combined androgen formulations
Schering-Plough brands
Merck & Co. brands
Prodrugs
Testosterone